Haplogroup E-M75 is a human Y-chromosome DNA haplogroup. Along with haplogroup E-P147, it is one of the two main branches of the older haplogroup E-M96.

Ancient DNA

Within Africa

Kenya

At Prettejohn's Gully, in Nakuru County, Kenya, there were two pastoralists of the early pastoral period; one carried haplogroups E2 (xE2b)/E-M75 and K1a, and another carried haplogroup L3f1b.

At Ilkek Mounds, in Nakuru County, Kenya, a pastoralist of the Pastoral Iron Age carried haplogroups E2 (xE2b)/E-M75 and L0f2a.

At Kisima Farm/C4, in Laikipia County, Kenya, a pastoralist of the Pastoral Iron Age, carried haplogroups E2 (xE2b)/E-M75 and L3h1a1.

Outside of Africa

United States of America

At an Anson Street burial site, in Charleston, South Carolina, there were 18 African Americans found who were dated to the 18th century CE. Coosaw, who was of West African and Native American ancestry, carried haplogroups E2b1a-CTS2400 and A2.

Distribution

Sorted frequency table of E-M75+ populations. Note that a "?" specifies that the sublineage of E-M75 was either untested for or unreported in the relevant study.

Subclades

Paragroup E-M75

Haplogroup E-M75(xM41,M54) has been found in 6% (1/18) of a sample of Dama from Namibia, 4% (1/26) of a sample of Ganda from Uganda, 3% (1/39) of a sample of Mandinka from Gambia/Senegal, and 2% (1/49) of a sample of Shona from Zimbabwe.

E-M41

Haplogroup E-M41 has been found mainly in populations of the Great Lakes and Upper Nile regions of Central-East Africa, including 67% (6/9) of a sample of Alur from the DRC, 39% (7/18) of a sample of Hema from the DRC, 17% (15/88) of a sample from Ethiopia, 8% (2/26) of a sample of Ganda from Uganda, 5% (2/40) of a sample from Sudan, 4% (3/69) of a sample of Hutu from Rwanda, 3% (1/29) of a sample of Bantus from Kenya, and 2% (1/43) of a sample of Iraqw from Tanzania.

E-M54

Haplogroup E-M54 has been found in 28% (22/80) of a sample of Xhosa from South Africa, 27% (10/37) of a sample of Rimaibe from Burkina Faso, 22% (4/18) of a sample of Daba from northern Cameroon, 21% (6/29) of a sample of Zulu from South Africa, 15% (8/53) of a sample of non-Khoisan Southern Africans, 14% (4/29) of a sample of Bantus from Kenya, 14% of a sample of Comorian Shirazi, 11% (1/9) of a small sample of speakers of Central Sudanic and Saharan languages from northern Cameroon, 9% (3/35) of a sample of Malagasy from Madagascar,  8% (3/37) of a sample from Central Africa, 7% (2/28) of a sample of Mandara from northern Cameroon, 6% (2/31) of a sample of Ngumba from southern Cameroon, 6% (4/64) of a sample of !Kung from South Africa, 6% (1/18) of a sample of Dama from Namibia, 5% (5/100) of a sample of Fon from Benin, 5% (1/22) of a sample of Ambo from Namibia, 4% (3/69) of a sample of Hutu from Rwanda, 4% (4/94) of a sample of Tutsi from Rwanda, 4% (2/47) of a sample of Mbuti from the DRC, 4% (1/26) of a sample of Ganda from Uganda, 4% (1/26) of a sample of Khwe from South Africa, 4% (1/28) of a sample of Sotho-Tswana from South Africa, 3% (1/33) of a sample of Bakola from southern Cameroon, 3% (1/34) of a sample of Wolof from Gambia/Senegal, 3% (2/72) of a sample from Qatar, 2% (1/42) of a sample of Kikuyu and Kamba from Kenya, 2% (1/55) of a sample of Dogon from Mali, and approximately 2% of a sample of 121 Arabs from Oman.

It has been suggested that haplogroup E-M85 Y-chromosomes have spread through Sub-Saharan Africa quite recently based on the fact that Y-STR microsatellite haplotypes associated with these chromosomes show a low degree of differentiation throughout their broad geographic range. Furthermore, the mean variance of STR alleles of E-M85 chromosomes is higher in Central-Western Africans than in the Southern African Khoisan, leading researchers to propose that E-M85 might have been involved in the range expansion of Bantu-speaking peoples from Central-Western Africa toward Southern Africa.

E-M98*

E-M98(xM85) has been found in 4% (2/49) of a sample of Mossi from Burkina Faso.

E-M200

E-M200 has been found in 25% (3/12) of a small sample of Mbuti from the Democratic Republic of the Congo. According to Figure 4 of Cruciani (2002), all three Bambuti who exhibit the M200 mutation share an identical microsatellite haplotype based on seven STR loci with one another and with some E-M85(xM200) Khoisan (!Kung and/or Khwe) individuals from South Africa.

Phylogenetics

Phylogenetic history

Prior to 2002, there were in academic literature at least seven naming systems for the Y-Chromosome phylogenetic tree. This led to considerable confusion. In 2002, the major research groups came together and formed the Y-Chromosome Consortium (YCC). They published a joint paper that created a single new tree that all agreed to use. Later, a group of citizen scientists with an interest in population genetics and genetic genealogy formed a working group to create an amateur tree aiming at being, above all, timely.  The table below brings together all of these works at the point of the landmark 2002 YCC tree. This allows a researcher reviewing older published literature to quickly move between nomenclatures.

Research publications

The following research teams per their publications were represented in the creation of the YCC tree.

Phylogenetic trees

This phylogenetic tree of haplogroup  subclades is based on the YCC 2008 tree and subsequent published research.

 E-M75 (M75, P68)
 E-M41 (M41/P210)
 E-M98 (M98)
 E-M54 (M54, M90)
 E-M85 (M85)
 E-M200 (M200)
 E-P45 (P45)
 E-P258 (P258)

See also

Genetics

Y-DNA E subclades

Y-DNA backbone tree

References

Bibliography

Sources for conversion tables

External links

 Y-DNA Haplogroup E and Its Subclades from ISOGG 2008

E

ca:Haplogrup E del cromosoma Y humà
de:Haplogruppe E (Y-DNA)
es:Haplogrupo E ADN-Y
fr:Haplogroupe E (Y-ADN)